"Groove Thang" is a song by American R&B group Zhané from their debut album, Pronounced Jah-Nay (1994). Released in January 1994, it was produced by and features a rap verse from Naughty by Nature. The song is based on a sample of "Haven't You Heard" as performed by Patrice Rushen. It peaked at number 17 on the US Billboard Hot 100. A music video was produced to promote the single, directed by Markus Blunder.

Critical reception
Jose F. Promis at AllMusic considered "Groove Thang" to be "smooth and infectious" but noted its similarity to the group's previous single, stating that it "sounds like 'Hey Mr. D.J.' part two." J.D. Considine from The Baltimore Sun described it as "near-irresistible" and a "sturdy, bass-thumping number". Larry Flick from Billboard felt it "is propelled by precious lead vocals and a chorus that sneaks up on you when you least expect it." He added, "Plush instrumentation is another plus in the act's bid to keep the momentum at radio and retail in high gear. Overall, odds are in its favor." Ralph Tee from Music Weeks RM Dance Update declared it as "a fresh new tune destined to do huge things", "with chirpy vocals and a bouncy mid-tempo dance groove". Another editor, James Hamilton, described it as a "slowed down Patrice Rushen 'Haven't You Heard' based sweet slinky strong jogger".

Track listings
 12-inch vinyl "Groove Thang" (LP version) – 3:54
 "Groove Thang" (Kay Gee's remix) – 4:25
 "Groove Thang" (remix instrumental) – 4:29
 "Groove Thang" (acapella) – 3:38
 "Groove Thang" (Maurice's club mix) – 7:40
 "Groove Thang" (Maurice's Groove dub) – 7:06

 Maxi-CD single'
 "Groove Thang" (LP version) – 3:54
 "Groove Thang" (Kay Gee's remix) – 4:25
 "Groove Thang" (Maurice's club mix) – 7:40
 "Groove Thang" (Maurice's Groove dub) – 7:06
 "Groove Thang" (remix instrumental) – 4:29

Charts

Weekly charts

Year-end charts

Release history

References

1993 songs
1994 singles
Motown singles
Naughty by Nature songs
Song recordings produced by Naughty by Nature
Songs written by KayGee
Songs written by Patrice Rushen
Songs written by Treach
Songs written by Vin Rock
Zhané songs